Battle of Amba Alagi refers to:

 Battle of Amba Alagi (1895)
 Battle of Amba Alagi (1941)